Bernard Schreiber  (born January 20, 1959), is an American former international motorcycle trials rider. He became the only American to win the FIM Trial World Championship in 1979. Schreiber is also four-time winner of the NATC Trials Championship, winning the title in 1978, 1982, 1983 and 1987. In 2000 he was inducted into the AMA Motorcycle Hall of Fame and, in 2020 he was named an FIM Legend.

Biography
Born in Los Angeles,  California, Schreiber started competing in trials at the age of 10 in 1969.  Within a few years he had established himself as a top contender in Southern California and began competing in the FIM Trial World Championship in 1977 at 17 years of age. In 1978 he won the US national title and finished third in the World  Trials Championship behind defending champion Yrjo Vesterinen and Martin Lampkin, racking up victories in France, Spain, the United States and Italy in the process.

Schreiber made history in 1979 when he became the first American to win the World Trials Championship. After a slow start to the season Schreiber put together four wins and three additional podiums out of the last eight rounds to take the title. A midseason switch from Bultaco to Italjet during 1980 helped Schreiber end the season on a high, winning the last four rounds, but not quite enough to retain the title finishing second behind Swede Ulf Karlsson. A mixed season followed in 1981 and prompted a switch to SWM for 1982. Only missing the podium twice all 1982 saw him again runner up, this time to emerging Belgian talent Eddy Lejeune. 1982 also marked Schreiber's only victory at the prestigious Scottish Six Days Trial, coming from behind to overtake Lejeune on the last day of the competition. His good riding paid dividends in the US Nationals with Schreiber taking back-to-back national championship titles in 1982 and 1983. Schreiber and Lejeune battled for the world title over the next couple of years with Lejeune edging out the American both years. After returning to the US national championship, Schreiber took his fourth and final US title in 1987 riding a Fantic.

National Trials Championship Career

International Trials Championship Career

Honors 
 US NATC Trials Champion 1978, 1982, 1983, 1987
 FIM Trials World Champion 1979
 Scottish Six Day Trial Winner 1982

References 

1959 births
Living people
American motorcycle racers
Motorcycle trials riders
Motorcycle racers from Los Angeles